Ancherythroculter lini is a species of cyprinid in the genus Ancherythroculter. It is native to the Zhujiang River in China and was described in 1994.

References

Cyprinidae
Freshwater fish of China
Fish described in 1994